Vijay Nagar is a major residential area in Indore, as a part of Greater Indore. Developed by the Indore Development Authority, the suburb saw a boom in population in the late 1990s. Real estate prices have since shot up and are among the highest in Indore, in part because of the continued influx of immigrants. Vijay Nagar is located in the eastern part of the city and is nestled between MR-9, MR-10, and Eastern Ring Road.  Lately, with the development of Indore BRTS, the area has witnessed rampant growth. Today, It has developed as the major commercial hub of Indore.

Entertainment
Vijay Nagar is popular for its malls like the C-21, Malhar Mega Mall, Mangal City and Orbit. There are a number of food chains and cafes in the area including Starbucks, KFC, McDonald's, Pizza Hut and Domino's. The streets of Vijay Nagar are dotted with shops and high end shopping plazas. Furthermore, locals state that good food is available in this location. Playotel, Hotel Marriott, Hotel Wow and Sayaji, the leading hotels of Indore are in Vijay Nagar as well.

Society flats 
The locality consists of IDA Flats and also private societies. Some notable societies in the area are Shalimar Township, Shekhar Planet, Nandini Vihar, Suyash Club and BCM Heights

Nearby Suburbs
Sukhliya/MR10 Region
Palasia
Khajrana Temple Area

Getting there

Bus Routes:

004 Panchwati - Vaishali Nagar 005 Arvindo Hospital - Mhow Naka  
017 Silver Springs - MR10

You can also go to Vijay Nagar from any of the taxi stands. The suburb can be comfortably reached using Ola and Uber. You can also get luxurious cars on rental for roaming in the city at considerably low rates.

Suburbs of Indore
Neighbourhoods in Indore